Zipeprol is a centrally acting cough suppressant developed in France in the 1970s. It is not a morphinan derivative (in contrast to codeine and dextromethorphan). Zipeprol acts as a local anaesthetic and has mucolytic, antihistamine and anticholinergic properties. It is sold with several brand names such as Zinolta and Respilene. It is not available in the United States or Canada and has been discontinued in Europe. It is still available in some countries in Asia and South America.

Zipeprol has been misused in Korea, mainly for the hallucinations it produces. Such use has become an issue due to the seizures and various neurological side effects it causes at high dosages.

References 

Antitussives
Piperazines
Phenylethanolamine ethers
Secondary alcohols